The Gateway Clipper Fleet, founded by John E. Connelly, is a Pittsburgh, Pennsylvania-based fleet of riverboats.  The fleet cruises the three rivers of Pittsburgh - the Monongahela, Allegheny, and Ohio.  The fleet is named after the city of Pittsburgh, which in earlier times was known as the "Gateway to the West". The original riverboat was Gateway Clipper, which set sail in 1958.  By the mid-1960s, the fleet was composed of three craft, Gateway Clipper, Party Liner, and Good Ship Lollipop. In 1999 it added its fifth ship.  In 2008 the Gateway Clipper Fleet celebrated its 50th year of sailing on the Three Rivers. In 2013, the fleet added its sixth ship, the all-steel classic paddle wheel Three Rivers Queen.

Today there are six ships in the fleet:

The Gateway Clipper Fleet offers many types of cruises, from sightseeing cruises and day trips for school groups to party and formal dinner cruises including wedding receptions. Shuttle service to PNC Park and Heinz Field is available on days of Pittsburgh Pirates, Pittsburgh Steelers, and Pitt Panthers home games.

The fleet is believed to be the largest inland riverboat fleet in the United States.

The fleet was once moored at the Monongahela Wharf, but since the 1980s has been moored at Station Square, where the dock and loading bay are.

References

Transportation in Pittsburgh
Passenger ships of the United States
Tourist attractions in Pittsburgh
Monongahela River
Allegheny River
Ohio River